Monogold is a three piece Psychedelic, Indie-Pop band from Brooklyn, New York formed in 2005. Members are guitarist-vocalist Keith Kelly, bassist Mike Falotico and drummer Jared Apuzzo. Their recordings are generally DIY recorded and produced by the band. They have been cited by The Wall Street Journal and Deli Magazine as a band to watch.

Discography
Records are Waves (EP) - 2006
This Bloom (EP) - 2007
We Animals (EP) - 2009
The Softest Glow - 2011
Good Heavens - 2015
Babyfood - 2017

References

Psychedelic rock music groups from New York (state)
American indie pop musicians